Stanislav Pokhilko (born 14 June 1975) is a Russian ski jumper. He competed in the normal hill and large hill events at the 1994 Winter Olympics.

References

1975 births
Living people
Russian male ski jumpers
Olympic ski jumpers of Russia
Ski jumpers at the 1994 Winter Olympics
Place of birth missing (living people)